Francis Richardson (1815–1896) was a British merchant who working for trading firms in East Asia and the United Kingdom.

Richardson sailed from Glasgow to Manila in 1837 to join the firm Paterson & Co.  They subsequently became McEwen & Co. and moved to Singapore and Java in 1851

In 1853, Richardson relocated with his firm back to the United Kingdom.  He became a director of the Borneo Company on its formation in 1856, progressing to Chairman from 1871 until his death in 1896.

References

1815 births
1896 deaths
British merchants
19th-century British businesspeople